= Skupski =

Skupski is a surname. Notable people with the surname include:

- Ken Skupski (born 1983), British tennis player
- Neal Skupski (born 1989), British tennis player, younger brother of Ken
